Allgemeine Zeitung is a German regional daily newspaper, published in Mainz, the capital of Rhineland-Palatinate.

History 
The paper was founded in 1850 as the Täglicher Straßenanzeiger (daily street advertisement). From 1854 a redaction developed political, business, cultural and local news. The name was changed to Mainzer Anzeiger. After World War I, the paper developed to a regionally read daily. The publication house was destroyed in the Air raid on 27 February 1945. In the fall of 1945, a paper was founded named Neuer Mainzer Anzeiger, changed once more in May 1947 to Allgemeine Zeitung.

References

External links 
Allgemeine Zeitung history

German-language newspapers
Daily newspapers published in Germany
Mass media in Mainz
Publications established in 1850